Quercus dankiaensis is the accepted name of tree species the beech family Fagaceae; there are no known subspecies. It is placed in Quercus sect. Cyclobalanopsis.

The species appears to be endemic to Vietnam (especially Lam Dong Province), where it may be called sồi Dankia.  It is a main canopy tree, growing up to 30 m and has relatively large acorns in 22 x 8 mm cupules.

References

External links

dankiaensis
Endemic flora of Vietnam
Flora of Indo-China
Trees of Vietnam
Taxa named by Aimée Antoinette Camus